Quilpe Airport  is an airstrip serving San Pablo, a town and commune in the Los Lagos Region of Chile.

There is rising terrain west through north.

See also

Transport in Chile
List of airports in Chile

References

External links
OpenStreetMap - Quilpe Airport
OurAirports - Quilpe Airport
FallingRain - Quilpe Airport

Airports in Chile
Airports in Los Lagos Region